The Gwalior Trade Fair is a largest in India trade fair in India. It was started in 1905 by the King of Gwalior, Maharaj Madhav Rao Scindia.

Gwalior trade fair consists of large showrooms of several national and international brands such as Audi, Mercedes, BMW, Samsung, and LG along with food zones, amusement rides, shops of clothes, bags, electronics, mobiles, laptops, cars, bikes, buses, trucks etc.

Location
Covering  and divided into several 'blocks' and 'sectors', the Mela (Hindi for fair) Ground at Race Course Road is known as the Pragati Maidan of Madhya Pradesh, India. The Gwalior Trade Fair Authority, an autonomous body, is responsible for the administration of the Fair.

Attractions
Major attractions of the fair include the "Haasya Kavi Sammelan" (the poet's gathering), the "Kavvali Dangals", the "Mushairas", Cultural Evenings, Music Nights, and several other activities integral to the Mela.

The cattle trade fair is an integral part of the Fair, with about 10,000 animals being sold or bought each year.

Shilp Bazaar is a beautiful attraction of Gwalior Trade Fair. In this bazaar, different types of handmade things are sold by people from all over India.

References

External links
 Gwalior trade fair

Gwalior culture
Economy of Madhya Pradesh
Fairs in India
Recurring events established in 1905
Trade fairs in India
Festivals established in 1905
1905 establishments in India